Ure or URE may refer to:

People
 Alan Ure, English football manager
 Alexander Ure, 1st Baron Strathclyde (1853–1928), Scottish politician and judge
 Andrew Ure (1778–1857), Scottish doctor, scholar and chemist
 Annie Ure (1893–1976), English archaeologist and curator of Ure Museum of Greek Archaeology
 David Ure (1749–1798), Scottish geologist
 David A. Ure (1910–1953), Canadian politician
 Gudrun Ure (born 1926), Scottish actress
 Ian Ure (born 1939), Scottish footballer
 Jean Ure (born 1943), English children's author
 Joan Ure, pen name of Elizabeth Clark (1918–1978), English-Scottish poet and playwright
 Sir John Ure (diplomat) (born 1931), British diplomat (retired) and writer
 Mary Ure (1933–1975), Scottish actress
 Midge Ure (born 1953), Scottish musician
 Nicky Youre, real name Ure (born 1999), American singer-songwriter
 Percy Ure (1879–1950), British classics professor, founder of Ure Museum of Greek Archaeology, husband of Annie Ure
 William Ure (1913–2001), Canadian politician

As an acronym
 Kuressaare Airport (IATA airport code), Estonia
 Ukrainian Soviet Encyclopedia, Ukrainian abbreviation (Ukrayinska Radyanska Entsyklopediya, URE)
 Unión de Radioaficionados Españoles, an amateur radio organization in Spain
 Universal Network Objects Runtime Environment, an independent OpenOffice.org component model
 University Radio Essex, campus radio station for the University of Essex, England
 Unrecoverable read error rate, a media assessment measure related to RAID hard disk drive storage technology
 Xpression FM, campus radio station for the University of Exeter, which used to be named University Radio Exeter

Other uses
 Urë, Albania
 Ure, Shetland, a place in Shetland
 Ure Museum of Greek Archaeology, Reading, England
 Ure or urus (French for Aurochs), an extinct species of large wild cattle
 River Ure, North Yorkshire, England
 River Ure, Lorn, a river in the South-west Highlands of Scotland

See also 
 San José de Uré
 
 Ur, an ancient city
 Uri (disambiguation)